Juan de Mañozca y Zamora (1580 – 12 December 1650) was a Roman Catholic prelate who served as Archbishop of Mexico (1643–1650).

Biography
Juan de Mañozca y Zamora was born in Markina, Spain. On 14 Jul 1643, he was selected by the King of Spain and confirmed by Pope Urban VIII on 16 Nov 1643 as Archbishop of Mexico. On 24 Feb 1645, he was consecrated bishop by Juan de Palafox y Mendoza, Bishop of Tlaxcala with Fernando Montero Espinosa, Bishop of Nueva Segovia serving as co-consecrator. He served as Archbishop of Mexico until his death on 12 Dec 1650. While bishop, he was the principal consecrator of Miguel de Poblete Casasola, Archbishop of Manila (1650).

References

External links and additional sources
 (for Chronology of Bishops) 
 (for Chronology of Bishops) 

1580 births
1650 deaths
17th-century Roman Catholic archbishops in Mexico
Roman Catholic archbishops of Mexico (city)
Spanish Roman Catholic bishops in North America
Bishops appointed by Pope Urban VIII